Sharp Gallaher Racing (formerly known as Eddie Sharp Racing) is a disbanded NASCAR team based in Mooresville, North Carolina that competed in the ARCA Racing Series and the NASCAR Camping World Truck Series. The team fielded the No. 6 Chevrolet Silverado for Justin Lofton and various other drivers and the No. 8 Chevrolet for Max Gresham.

History

ARCA
The team was formed by former driver and crew chief Eddie Sharp in 2005, who had formerly fielded his own ASA team and was the crew chief for Bill Baird during his championship-winning 1999 ARCA season. The team made its debut in 2006 with former Grand-Am driver Michael McDowell running a limited schedule. McDowell and Sharp ran full-time in 2007, running the No. 2 Make-A-Wish Foundation Dodge. McDowell grabbed four wins in his rookie season but finished second in the championship to Frank Kimmel. ESR also fielded the No. 22 Dodge, with Josh Wise and Ken Butler III sharing the ride, with Butler winning at Toledo Speedway. With McDowell moving on to Michael Waltrip Racing, Sharp expanded to three teams and switched to running Toyotas, hiring former Scuderia Toro Rosso Formula 1 driver Scott Speed to drive the No. 2, while retaining Butler for the full season and fielding a third car (No. 93) in a number of races for Canadian NASCAR driver Pierre Bourque. The team soon changed numbers to the No. 20 with Justin Lofton for the rest of the year. ESR dominated the season, with Speed winning four races en route to a second-place finish in the championship and Lofton won at Michigan.

With Speed heading to the Sprint Cup Series, ESR gained a reputation of fielding championship-caliber drivers. In 2009, Lofton stayed on with ESR for the full season as the team expanded to a fourth car, the No. 81 for Camping World Series East driver Craig Goess. The No. 2 would be driven by another Grand-Am driver, Tim George Jr., and the No. 20 would be driven by Canadian Steve Arpin on a part-time basis. Lofton won ESR's first ever championship that season, grabbing an impressive four wins, while Goess and Arpin impressed many. Like his predecessors, Lofton moved to Red Horse Racing to run for the Camping World Truck Series title in 2010, while Goess returned for the full season. ESR ran only Goess' 81 for the full season, while continuing to field the 6 for a bevy of drivers, including another former F1 driver, Nelson Piquet Jr., Blake Koch, Brandon McReynolds (son of Fox broadcaster Larry McReynolds), and others. Goess had a solid season, winning only once at Pocono but finishing second in points to Patrick Sheltra.

NASCAR Truck Series

2006: Woodard & Sharp Racing
ESR made its first foray into NASCAR in 2006, when he partnered with co-owner Rick Woodard to field a full-time Truck Series team that year with former Hendrick Motorsports development driver Boston Reid running full-time in the No. 25. Woodard did not join Sharp's existing ARCA team as a co-owner, and their Truck team was operated separately from it. After the first four races of the season, Sharp left WSR, leaving Woodard as the team's only owner. Reid would be replaced by ARCA driver Damon Lusk as the team's driver with five races to go in the season. Although the team supposedly was preparing to return for at least the Daytona season-opener, Woodard Racing closed down before the start of the 2007 season.

2010: Sharp-Hartman Racing
Sharp would not be an owner in the Truck Series again until 2010, where he returned to the series with another co-owner, Carl Hartman, to field a No. 41 Toyota Tundra for Steve Park in two events.

2010–2013: Eddie Sharp Racing

Late in the season, ESR had purchased the assets of Team Gill Racing No. 46 and had intended to run Craig Goess for Rookie of the Year in 2011. After only 9 races, Goess was released from the team and Sharp was reunited with Lofton, who had sponsorship from CollegeComplete.com and a new crew chief in Daniel Bormann.

For 2012, Eddie Sharp purchased the spun-off assets of Kevin Harvick Incorporated that were not acquired in the race team's merger with Richard Childress Racing, specifically the 8 and 33 trucks driven by Piquet and Ron Hornaday. Cale Gale drove the 33 in 2012 with sponsorship from Rheem, and a technical alliance with Childress. The 8 truck was driven by Mike Skinner at Daytona, but he wrecked early alongside Gale. In Martinsville, Eddie Sharp sold the No. 8 Truck's owners points to Jennifer Jo Cobb, who swapped manufacturers and numbers (Cobb had the No. 8 as a Dodge, while Chris Lafferty drove the No. 10 Chevrolet). Sharp then gave the owners points to Cobb for the rest of 2012 in order to allow the truck to eventually be used part-time if a third driver was necessary.  On May 18, 2012, Justin Lofton won his first race in the No. 6 truck. Gale would win the season finale at Homestead in a photo finish.

For 2013, Lofton would reduce his schedule to only a few races, while Gale and Rheem departed for Turner Scott Motorsports. Max Gresham would run the full schedule for the team, with Truck Series veteran crew chief Gary Showalter.

2013: Sharp Gallaher Racing
In August of that year, Eddie Sharp announced a partnership with California businessman Bill Gallaher, changing the team name to Sharp Gallaher Racing. Soon after this, it was also announced that the team would relocate from Denver, North Carolina to the stock car racing hotbed of Mooresville, North Carolina. On December 17, 2013, reports arose that the team had shut down with immediate effect until later in the day when it was confirmed that the team had shut down with the remaining staff being laid off.

References

External links
 

American auto racing teams
Defunct NASCAR teams
ARCA Menards Series teams
2005 establishments in North Carolina
Auto racing teams disestablished in 2013
2013 disestablishments in North Carolina
Auto racing teams established in 2005